Brackenfell is a town in the Western Cape province of South Africa at the gateway to the Cape Winelands. Organisationally and administratively it is included in the City of Cape Town Metropolitan Municipality as a Northern Suburb and is about 30 kilometres (19 mi) east of Cape Town City Bowl. In Brackenfell a variety of property situated on the slopes of the Bottelary Hills can be found.

The Bracken Nature Reserve, situated in the Ruwari suburban area, was once a quarry site and was later declared a nature reserve after some negotiations between the Cape Town City Council and the Stellenbosch Divisional Council.

Brackenfell offers schools, shopping malls and medical services, and many different sporting facilities.

History

The earliest activity on what today is known as Brackenfell was when the "de Clapmuts" was a refreshment post. Brackenfell specifically form part of Klapmutsberg, better known as de Bottelarij. In 1712 the area known as "Kruispad" was transferred to Selie, J. Kruispad was owned by Brink, A. and in 1901 he sold it to a Scottish Immigrant Walton, G.H. The flora on this farm reminded him of the same in Scotland. He called it Brackenfell (Bracken means fern; Fell means hill). The richness of granite in the area let to the farm being sold to a Brick company in 1903 and a granite quarry was established. Activity here stopped in 1948. In 1904 a railway station was established.

Brackenfell used to be a major road crossing during the earlier days of Cape Town, but today it is a well-known suburb located behind the 'boerewors gordyn' which translates to sausage curtain, meaning; people living in this area, braai (barbecue) boerewors very often. "Gordyn" curtain is just by figure of speech.  It's all said tongue-in-the-cheek.

Due to the rising numbers of COVID-19 cases in the Western Cape, the Western Cape Health Department constructed a field hospital in the Brackengate industrial area. It opened on 20 July 2020 with 10 patients. The field hospital has capacity 300 beds for COVID-19 patients from hospitals struggling with capacity.

The field hospital became the central COVID-19 dedicated hospital for the Western Cape in September as the Cape Town International Convention Centre's field hospital which was the central COVID-19 dedicated hospital was decommissioned in September due to declining COVID-19 cases in the City of Cape Town.

Geography

Brackenfell is located on the north-eastern outskirts of the Cape Metropole (Cape Town metropolitan area). Being on the outskirts of the city and at the gateway of the Cape Winelands means that Stellenbosch, Paarl and Durbanville's wine farms are in easy access.

Located more or less halfway between the Cape Town and Paarl, Brackenfell is approximately 30 km north-east of Cape Town and 35 km south-west of Paarl.

The town is bordered by Kraaifontein in the north-east, Kuilsrivier in the south, Durbanville in the north-west and Bellville in the west.

Suburban areas
Brackenfell is divided into three suburban clusters namely Brackenfell North, Central and South.

Brackenfell North is located north of the N1 and includes the following suburbs:
Cape Gate (retail)
Chamonix (residential)
De Tuin (residential)
Kleinbron Estate (residential)
Kleinbron Park (residential)
Marlborough Park (residential)
Vredekloof (residential)
Vredekloof Glen (residential)
Vredekloof Heights (residential)
Vredekloof Rand (residential)
Welgeleë (residential)

Brackenfell Central is located between the N1 and R101 Old Paarl Road and includes following suburbs:
Arauna (residential)
Brackenfell Industria (industrial)
Eden Park (residential)
Ferndale (residential)
Hoogstede (residential)
Morgenster (residential)
Morgenster Heights (residential)
Okavango Park (industrial)
Springbokpark (residential)
St Michaels (residential)

Brackenfell South is located between the R101 Old Paarl Road and the M23 Bottelary Road is presently the centre of property development in Brackenfell. Brackenfell South includes the following suburbs:
Birgundy (residential)
Brackenfell South (residential)
De Oude Spruit (residential)
Kaapsig (residential)
Klaradyn Retirement Village (residential)
Protea Heights (residential)
Protea Village (residential)
Ruwari (residential)
Sonkring (residential)

Schools

 Bastion Primary School
 Brackenfell High School
 Brackenfell Primary School
 Brooklands Primary School 
 Curro Brackenfell (private primary school)
 Curro Castle (private nursery / pre-primary school)
 Destinatus Private School
 Northpine Primary School 
 Northpine Technical High School 
 Paarl School
 Protea Heights Academy (high school)
 Vredekloof Primary School

Economy
Brackenfell is home to many retail companies' head offices such as Shoprite, Checkers (falls under Shoprite) as well as Food Lover's Market. Shoprite-Checkers have a new distribution centre which was completed in 2019 at the Brackengate 2 Business Park named the Cilmor Distribution Centre.

Retail
With the development of the Cape Gate shopping precinct, Brackenfell has become one of the most important retail hubs in the Northern Suburbs of Cape Town and in Greater Cape Town as a whole. Within the precinct is the Cape Gate Shopping Centre which is the largest shopping centre in Brackenfell and adjacent to the shopping centre is the Cape Gate Lifestyle Centre. 

In Brackenfell North, the Glengarry Shopping Centre serves the neighbourhood of Vredekloof and even the neighbouring parts of Durbanville. In Brackenfell South, the Boulevard Square Shopping Centre serves the neighbourhood of Protea Heights and Brackenfell South as a whole. 

In Brackenfell Central there are four shopping centres which include the Fairbridge Mall owned by Shoprite Checkers, Brackenfell Centre, the newly revamped Brackenfell Corner (previously Paradys Park) and the newly revamped Brackenfell Shopping Centre.

Transport

Bus & Taxi Transit 
Brackenfell is one of the very few towns in the Cape Town metropolitan area that is not served by the Golden Arrow Bus Services.

Brackenfell is served two kinds of taxis: metered taxis and minibus taxis. Unlike many cities and towns in South Africa, metered taxis are not allowed to drive around the town to solicit fares and instead must be called to a specific location. Metered taxi companies operating around Brackenfell include Uber, Bolt, InDriver and DiDi. 

Minibus taxi services to Brackenfell are also relatively limited and the town itself does not have a taxi terminus. There are, however, a few taxi routes to the neighbouring towns of Bellville and Kraaifontein.

Rail 
Brackenfell lies on the Northern Line of the Metrorail Western Cape commuter rail system. The rail system links the town to Cape Town in the south-west via Bellville and to Wellington via Kraaifontein, Klapmuts and Paarl. Due to the limited public transport services by buses or taxis in Brackenfell, the town is largely dependent on Metrorail to commute to other parts of the Cape Metropole.

Roads 
Brackenfell's main road is the R101 which is the original N1 and served the same function before the construction of the highway. Similarly to the current N1, the R101 was the main road between Cape Town and Paarl and thus the name of the road being Old Paarl Road. The R101 runs through the Central Business District (CBD) of Brackenfell and links the town to Cape Town in the south-west via Bellville, Parow and Goodwood and to Paarl in the north-east via Kraaifontein and Klapmuts.  

Brackenfell also has access to two major freeways in the Cape Metropole, the N1 and R300. The N1 highway runs through Brackenfell separating Brackenfell North from the rest of Brackenfell including the CBD in the south. The N1 connects Brackenfell with Cape Town in the south-west and Paarl in the north-east with two accessible off-ramps within Brackenfell including the Brackenfell Boulevard (Exit 28) and the Okavango Road (Exit 29) off-ramps. The R300 (Kuils River Freeway) begins at the interchange with the N1 highway named the "Stellenberg Interchange" bordering between Bellville and Brackenfell. From the N1, R300 connects Brackenfell to the Cape Town International Airport (via the N2) and Mitchells Plain in the south with two accessible off-ramps within Brackenfell including the Old Paarl Road (Exit 29) and Bottelary Road (Exit 26) off-ramps. 

Brackenfell is also served by a large network of metropolitan routes within the City of Cape Town including the M23 (Bottelary Road) to Stellenbosch (via the R304) and Bellville, M25 (Frans Conradie Drive) to Bellville and Kraaifontein, M73 (De Bron Road) to Durbanville and Kraaifontein, M100 (Brackenfell Boulevard) to the R302 intersection (to Malmesbury), Durbanville and Kuilsrivier and the M137 (Okavango Road) to the R302 intersection, Durbanville and Kraaifontein.

Coat of arms

Brackenfell was a municipality from 1970 to 1996.  In November 1971, the council registered a coat of arms at the Bureau of Heraldry.

The arms, designed by Cornelis Pama, were Per chevron embowed Or and Vert, three shot balls counterchanged, i.e. a shield divided by a curved chevron-shaped line into gold and green, with two green balls at the top and a golden ball at the bottom.  The crest was three ferns with the motto Tenax in fide.

Trivia

 Currently, Brackenfell (together with Kuilsrivier) uses the prefix "CFR-" in their registered motor vehicles (since approximately 2000 the prefix "CF-" which had formerly been allocated to Grahamstown has also been allocated to these suburbs).
 Kanonkop (directly translated to cannon head) Brackenfell's highest point in Ruwari, was used as a signal point with its signal cannons in the 1700s. Cannons can be seen at Brackenfell High School and Bastion Primary School.
 In Vredekloof Street in Vredekloof (a residential area of Brackenfell) the bird, the Cape Robin nest and is commonly known as Jan Frederik.
 The popular cooking and grill sauce Jimmy's Sauces CC is produced in Brackenfell and is sold not only in South Africa but also all over the world.

External links
 Brackenfell Directory

References

Suburbs of Cape Town